Ernest Rudolph "Ike" Klingbeil (November 3, 1908 – June 17, 1995) was an American professional hockey player.

A native of Hancock, Michigan, Klingbeil played the position of Defense. Klingbeil played for the Michigan Wolverines from 1932 to 1933 (MOHL), Detroit Mundus from 1933 to 1934 (MOHL), Detroit Farm Crest from 1934 to 1935 (MOHL), Detroit Tool Shop (MOHL), Chicago Black Hawks from 1936 to 1937 (NHL), and Portage Lakes Lakers from 1936 to 1940. A lifelong member of the American Legion in Hancock, Michigan, and the Immanuel Lutheran Church, Klingbeil also served as a Corporal in the United States Army Air Corps during World War II.

Klingbeil died in Colorado Springs, Colorado, in a military hospice, at the age of 86. He was buried in Fort Logan National Cemetery, Denver, Colorado.

External links

1908 births
1995 deaths
American men's ice hockey defensemen
Burials at Fort Logan National Cemetery
Chicago Blackhawks players
Ice hockey players from Michigan
Military personnel from Michigan
People from Hancock, Michigan
United States Army Air Forces soldiers
United States Army personnel of World War II